Alshikhovo (Alşik) is a rural locality (a settlement) in Ibresinsky District of the Chuvash Republic, Russia, located  from Cheboksary and  from Ibresi, the administrative center of the district.

The settlement is situated on a small river and is surrounded by forests.

The settlement's history goes back to 1928, when the first house was built here.  The first official mention of the village is dated August 29, 1931, and the settlement status was granted to it in 1940.

Etymology
According to the local legend, the village was named after Alshikh, the person who founded the village.  It is also possible that the village was named after a village of the same name in Tatarstan.

References

Rural localities in Chuvashia
Tsivilsky Uyezd